Georg Karo (11 January 1872, in Venice – 12 November 1963, in Freiburg im Breisgau) was a German archaeologist, known for his research of Mycenaean and Etruscan cultures.

Born in Venice and raised in Florence, he studied history, philosophy and archaeology at the universities of Munich and Bonn, where he was a pupil of Georg Loeschcke. Following graduation, he took an extended study trip to the Mediterranean region, during which time he performed manuscript studies in Rome. In 1902 he obtained his habilitation at Bonn, and from 1905 served as secretary under Wilhelm Dörpfeld at the German Archaeological Institute in Athens, where in 1910 he attained the post of director. While stationed in Greece, he conducted archaeological excavations at Tiryns and Corfu.

From 1920 to 1930 he was a professor of classical archaeology at the University of Halle, then afterwards returned to Athens. In 1936 he was relieved of his position at the German Archaeological Institute because of his Jewish ancestry. For a few years he worked as a writer in Munich, then in 1939 emigrated to the United States, where he taught classes as a guest professor at Oberlin and Claremont colleges. In 1953 he returned to Germany as an honorary professor at the University of Freiburg.

Selected writings 
 Die tyrsenische Stele von Lemnos, 1908, Mittheilungen des Kaiserlich Deutschen Archaeologischen Instituts, Athenische Abteilung, 33, 48—74, mit Tafel V.
 Die Schachtgräber von Mykenai, 1915 – Excavations at Mykenai.
 Führer durch die Ruinen von Tiryns, 1915 – On the ruins at Tiryns.
 Religion des ägäischen Kreises, 1925 – Religion of the Aegean region.
 Zwei etruskische Wundervögel; aus dem 8./7. Jahrhundert, 1954 – Two Etruscan Wundervögel of the 8th/7th century BCE.
 Greifen am Thron; Erinnerungen an Knossos, 1959 – Attaining the throne: recollections of Knossos.
 Also, he was the author of the following treatises published in English:
 An Attic cemetery; excavations in the Kerameikos at Athens under Gustav Oberlaender and the Oberlaender Trust, 1943.
 Greek personality in archaic sculpture, 1948.

References 

1872 births
1963 deaths
University of Bonn alumni
Ludwig Maximilian University of Munich alumni
Academic staff of the University of Halle
Academic staff of the University of Freiburg
German archaeologists
Archaeologists from Florence